Volgatitan (meaning "Volga giant") is a genus of titanosaurian sauropod dinosaur from the Early Cretaceous of the Ulyanovsk Oblast, Russia. The type and only species is Volgatitan simbirskiensis, known from seven  from a single individual. It is the oldest known titanosaur from the northern hemisphere, and is considered important for being related to the Lognkosauria, a group known only from South America later in the Late Cretaceous. It was first described in November 2018 by Russian palaeontologists Alexander Averianov and Vladimir Efimov.

Classification
Amerianov and Efimov recovered Volgatitan as a lithostrotian titanosaur. They found Lithostrotia to be divided into two main lineages, one containing Saltasauridae, the other containing Lognkosauria, with Volgatitan belonging to the latter. The following cladogram follows their analysis.

References

Early Cretaceous dinosaurs of Europe
Cretaceous Russia
Fossils of Russia
Fossil taxa described in 2018
Lithostrotians